Dandy is a surname. Notable people with the surname include:

James Edgar Dandy (1903–1976), British botanist
Raymond Dandy (1887–1953), French actor
John Garrick (1902–1966), British actor born Reginald Dandy
Walter Dandy (1886–1946), American neurosurgeon and scientist